Lumaria lotsunica is a species of moth of the family Tortricidae. It is found in India (Jammu and Kashmir).

The ground colour of the forewings is dirty cream, suffused with brownish especially in the dorsal half of the wing. The markings are brownish, but browner along the edges. The hindwings are whitish cream, suffused with brownish on the periphery.

References

External links

Moths described in 2006
Moths of Asia
Archipini
Taxa named by Józef Razowski